Brunei Darussalam participated in the 2005 Southeast Asian Games held in multiple venues in the Philippines from November 27, 2005 to December 5, 2005. The chief of mission to the games was Japar Bangkol.

Medalists

South
2005
Nations at the 2005 Southeast Asian Games